Chanderkanta Kaul (born 21 January 1971) is an Indian former cricketer who played as a right-handed batter. She appeared in 5 Test matches and 31 One Day Internationals for India between 1993 and 2000, and captained them in 1 Test and 4 ODIs. She played domestic cricket for Middlesex in 2001 and between 2007 and 2008.

References

External links

1971 births
Living people
Indian women cricketers
India women One Day International cricketers
India women Test cricketers
Cricketers from Jalandhar
Middlesex women cricketers
Railways women cricketers
Sportswomen from Punjab, India
Indian women cricket captains